Susāji Parish is an administrative unit of Balvi Municipality in the Latgale region of Latvia (Prior to 2009 it was part of Balvi District).

Towns, villages and settlements of Susāji Parish 
 Viļaka - parish administrative center

References 

Parishes of Latvia
Balvi Municipality
Latgale